There are a number of statues of Paul Bunyan on display in the United States.
Paul Bunyan was made by sculptor and artist Bill Swan.

Portland, Oregon

A statue of Paul Bunyan is the 31-foot-tall (9.4 m) concrete and metal sculpture which has stood in the Kenton neighborhood of Portland, Oregon since 1959.

Bangor, Maine

Another  statue can be found in Bangor, Maine. Standing since 1959, it weighs 3700 pounds. The statue is shown with a large ax in one hand, and a peavey in the other hand.

Klamath, California
At the Trees of Mystery in Klamath, California there is the   tallest known statue of Paul Bunyan."

Cheshire, Connecticut
When the 26-foot "Muffler Man" Paul Bunyan was erected in front of a local lumber business in the 1980s, the town objected to the statue, citing that it was a violation of town codes given its substantial height.  Finding no limitation on flagpole height on the books, the owners of the statue replaced Bunyan's axe with an American flag.

Others
Smaller (although still larger than life) statues can also be found in Akeley, Bemidji, and Brainerd, Minnesota; Manistique and Ossineke, Michigan; Muncie, Indiana; Aberdeen, South Dakota; and Lakewood, Wisconsin and Wabeno Wisconsin.  Paul Bunyan's Log Chute, an amusement park ride inside Bloomington, Minnesota's Mall of America, also houses large statues of Paul Bunyan and Babe the Blue Ox. The Paul Bunyan Logging Camp Museum at Carson Park (Eau Claire, Wisconsin) has statues of Paul Bunyan and Babe the Blue Ox. The Rumford, Maine visitor center is home to giant statues of Paul Bunyan and Babe the Blue Ox. In Stony Point, New York at local Scout Camp Bullowa, there is a 18 foot tall statue at the southern entrance. There is also a 19 foot Paul Bunyan in the Enchanted Forrest Water Safari in Old Forge, New York that was built in 1956.

References

External links
 

Colossal statues in the United States
Paul Bunyan
Sculptures of men
Statues of fictional characters